Sonthi may refer to:

Sonthi Boonyaratglin (born 1946), former Commander-in-Chief of the Royal Thai Army
Sonthi River, tributary of the Pa Sak River

See also 
Amphoe Lam Sonthi, the easternmost district of Lopburi Province, central Thailand
 Sondhi